Jill Seymour (born 8 May 1958) is a British politician who served as a Member of the European Parliament (MEP) for the West Midlands from 2014 to 2019. Elected for the UK Independence Party (UKIP) in 2014, in April 2019 she defected to the Brexit Party. Despite her defection, she was not selected as a Brexit Party candidate for the 2019 European Parliament elections, and ceased to remain an MEP on 26 May 2019.

Political career
Jill Seymour joined UKIP in 2002. She worked for the MEP Nikki Sinclaire before the latter left Ukip. Seymour resigned from UKIP's NEC in 2011 citing personal reasons.

In 2015 she was criticized for renting an office in Shropshire from her husband Brian with taxpayers' money. The Independent commented that there was no suggestion that the arrangement was against European Parliament rules. The arrangement would not however been acceptable for a member of the UK Parliament.

She stood unsuccessfully for the UK Parliament in 2015, coming third at The Wrekin, but she did not stand in the 2017 election.

Transport spokesperson
After becoming an MEP, Seymour was appointed UKIP's transport spokesperson, serving until 2018 when she expressed unease about the direction the party was taking.
As transport spokesperson Seymour was pro-car and anti-High Speed 2. In 2015, she became patron of the Alliance of British Drivers.

References

External links

Jill Seymour in her own words
 http://jillseymourukip.org/

1958 births
Living people
UK Independence Party MEPs
Brexit Party MEPs
MEPs for England 2014–2019
21st-century women MEPs for England
UK Independence Party parliamentary candidates

Politicians from Shropshire